Terrance Nathaniel Ollivierre is a Vincentian politician, teacher and vocalist. Terrance is also the New Democratic Party Southern Grenadines candidate  for 2020 Vincentian general election.

Terrance is the Member of Parliament for the constituency of Southern Grenadines in the House of Assembly of Saint Vincent and the Grenadines.

Political career 

In the 2001 general election Terrance competed for the first time for elections and was elected to House of Assembly of Saint Vincent and the Grenadines.

On 7 December 2005 general elections, Terrance competed and was elected to  House of Assembly of Saint Vincent and the Grenadines as opposition (MP) with a voter amount of 1,857 

In 2010, Terrance was elected for a third term, but his party New Democratic Party was defeated by the Unity Labour Party

In 2015, his party leader Arnhim Eustace argued with current Prime Minister Ralph Gonsalves about elections being unfair.

References 

Living people
Members of the House of Assembly of Saint Vincent and the Grenadines
New Democratic Party (Saint Vincent and the Grenadines) politicians
1964 births